Hartford Fire Insurance Co. v. California, 509 U.S. 764 (1993), was a controversial United States Supreme Court case which held that foreign companies acting in foreign countries could nevertheless be held liable for violations of the Sherman Antitrust Act if they conspired to restrain trade within the United States, and succeeded in doing so.

Facts
Various reinsurance companies in the United Kingdom had conspired through Lloyd's of London to coerce U.S. insurers into abandoning certain policy practices that were beneficial to consumers, but costly to the reinsurers. When U.S. states (including the named plaintiff, California) filed a lawsuit alleging antitrust violations, the defendant companies raised a number of defenses, asserting that the United States lacked jurisdiction over their acts, that various statutes exempted them from liability, and that principles of comity dictated that they should not be brought before a U.S. court. The United States district court in which the case was brought accepted these arguments and dismissed the case. The Court of Appeals reversed the dismissal.

Result
The Supreme Court, in an opinion by Justice Souter, stated that "it is well established by now that the Sherman Act applies to foreign conduct that was meant to produce and did in fact produce some substantial effect in the United States."

The defendants raise, and the Court rejects the applicability of § 402 of the Foreign Trade Antitrust Improvements Act of 1982 (FTAIA), which states that the Sherman Act does not apply to conduct involving foreign trade or commerce (other than import trade or import commerce), unless "such conduct has a direct and reasonably foreseeable effect" on domestic or import commerce. The Court found that the conduct at issue here clearly had such an effect.

The Court also found that, in enacting the FTAIA, the U.S. Congress did not intend to write principles of comity into the Sherman Act - but even if they had, this would not affect the outcome. Both the defendant and Hartford argued that the conduct in which the reinsurers had engaged was lawful in the United Kingdom. Nevertheless, the Court looked to the Restatement (Third) Foreign Relations Law, § 415, Comment j for the principle that:
The fact that conduct is lawful in the state in which it took place will not, of itself, bar application of the United States antitrust laws, even where the foreign state has a strong policy to permit or encourage such conduct.
Furthermore, the Court cited Restatement (Third) Foreign Relations Law, § 403, Comment e for the proposition that no conflict exists "where a person subject to regulation by two states can comply with both."

Dissent
Justice Scalia dissented, joined in part by Justices O'Connor, Kennedy, and Thomas. Scalia acknowledged that the federal courts had jurisdiction over this case, and that the Sherman Act could be applied extraterritorially, so long as the foreign acts complained of were directed into the United States. Nevertheless, Scalia contended that the actions of the U.S. courts showed a lack of judicial respect for the comprehensive regulatory scheme enacted by the UK. Although Congress may have intended the Sherman Act to apply to acts originating abroad, it was unreasonable to assume that Congress intended to apply the antitrust laws where they would be disruptive of another country's legislative scheme.

See also
 List of United States Supreme Court cases, volume 509
 List of United States Supreme Court cases
 Lists of United States Supreme Court cases by volume
 List of United States Supreme Court cases by the Rehnquist Court

References

External links
 

United States Supreme Court cases
United States Supreme Court cases of the Rehnquist Court
United States antitrust case law
1993 in United States case law
1993 in California
Legal history of California
ITT Inc.
Reinsurance